Hu Jia (born January 10, 1983, in Wuhan, Hubei) is a male Chinese diver who won the gold medal at the 2004 Summer Olympics in the men's 10 metre platform. He was in sixth place at the end of the preliminary round, and fourth place after the semi-finals, but put in an excellent performance in the finals to take first place.

Hu also won two silver medals at the 2000 Summer Olympics in Sydney, Australia in the 10m Platform and 10 m Platform Synchronized.

Personal life
Hu Jia married synchronised swimmer Luo Xi in 2013. She gave birth to a son in 2015.

References

External links
 profile

1983 births
Living people
Chinese male divers
Divers at the 2000 Summer Olympics
Divers at the 2004 Summer Olympics
Olympic divers of China
Olympic gold medalists for China
Olympic silver medalists for China
Sportspeople from Wuhan
Olympic medalists in diving
Asian Games medalists in diving
Divers at the 2002 Asian Games
Medalists at the 2004 Summer Olympics
Medalists at the 2000 Summer Olympics
World Aquatics Championships medalists in diving
Asian Games gold medalists for China
Medalists at the 2002 Asian Games
Universiade medalists in diving
Universiade gold medalists for China
Medalists at the 2001 Summer Universiade
Medalists at the 2003 Summer Universiade
Medalists at the 2007 Summer Universiade
20th-century Chinese people
21st-century Chinese people